Sir Dennis Holme Robertson (23 May 1890 – 21 April 1963) was an English economist who taught at Cambridge and London Universities.

Biography 
Robertson, the son of a Church of England clergyman, was born in Lowestoft and educated as a scholar of Eton and at Trinity College, Cambridge, where he read Classics and Economics, graduating in 1912.

Robertson worked closely with John Maynard Keynes in the 1920s and 1930s, during the years when Keynes was developing many of the ideas that later were incorporated in his General Theory of Employment, Interest and Money. Keynes wrote that at that time, working with Robertson, it was good to work with someone who had a "completely first class mind". Robertson was the first to use the term "liquidity trap".  Ultimately however, differences of temperament and views about economic theory and practice (especially in the 1937 debate over the savings-investment relationship in the General Theory) led to some estrangement between the two men.

Robertson was elected to the American Academy of Arts and Sciences in 1945 and the American Philosophical Society in 1949.

Robertson died of a heart attack at Cambridge on 21 April 1963.

Main publications
 A Study of Industrial Fluctuations, 1915.
 "Economic Incentive", 1921, Economica.
 Money, 1922.
 The Control of Industry, 1923.
 "Those Empty Boxes", 1924, EJ.
 Banking Policy and the Price Level, 1926.
 "Increasing Returns and the Representative Firm", 1930, EJ.
 Economic Fragments, 1931.
 "How Do We Want Gold to Behave?", in The International Gold Problem (London: Humphrey Milford, 1932)
 "Saving and Hoarding", 1933, EJ.
 "Some Notes on Mr Keynes's "General Theory of Employment"", 1936, QJE.
 "Alternative Theories of the Rate of Interest", 1937, EJ.
 "Mr Keynes and Finance: A note", 1938, EJ.
 "Mr. Keynes and the Rate of Interest", 1940, in Essays in Monetary Theory
 Essays in Monetary Theory, 1940.
 "Wage Grumbles", 1949 in Readings in the Theory of Income Distribution.
 Utility and All That, 1952.
 Britain in the World Economy, 1954.
 Economic Commentaries, 1956.
 Lectures on Economic Principles, 1957–9.
 Growth, Wages, Money, 1961.
 Essays in Money and Interest, 1966

References

Sources
 Gordon Fletcher (2000), Understanding Dennis Robertson: The Man and His Work.
 J.R. Presley (1979), Robertsonian Economics.
 Ben B. Seligman (1962), Main Currents in Modern Economics: Economic Thought since 1870.

External links

 
 New School: Dennis Robertson

1890 births
1963 deaths
People from Lowestoft
People educated at Eton College
Alumni of Trinity College, Cambridge
English economists
Presidents of the Cambridge Union
Knights Bachelor
Professors of Political Economy (Cambridge, 1863)
Members of the American Philosophical Society